The Cherryvale Formation is a geologic formation in Oklahoma. It preserves fossils dating back to the Carboniferous period.

See also

 List of fossiliferous stratigraphic units in Oklahoma
 Paleontology in Oklahoma

References
 

Carboniferous geology of Oklahoma
Carboniferous southern paleotropical deposits